Mike Hurley (born 1958) is  a Canadian politician and the current mayor of  Burnaby, British Columbia, Canada.

Early life
Mike Hurley was born in 1958, in Magherafelt, Northern Ireland. In 1983, he moved to Canada. In 1988, he joined the Burnaby Fire Department. Hurley served as Vice President of the International Association of Fire Fighters, until he resigned after being elected as mayor.

Mayor
In October 2018, Mike Hurley, running as an independent candidate,  defeated long-time Burnaby mayor, Derek Corrigan. A key factor in Hurley's victory was due to his opposition to the Metrotown demovictions under Mayor Corrigan and seeking improved housing. In 2020, Hurley was selected as one of the Top 25 Canadian Immigrant Award Winners of 2020 presented by Canadian Immigrant Magazine.

References

External links

1958 births
Living people
Mayors of Burnaby
Northern Ireland emigrants to Canada
People from Magherafelt